The 2015–16 UTEP Miners basketball team represented the University of Texas at El Paso during the 2015–16 NCAA Division I men's basketball season. The Miners, led by sixth year head coach Tim Floyd, played their home games at the Don Haskins Center and were members of Conference USA. They finished the season 19–14, 10–8 in C-USA play to finish in sixth place. They defeated FIU in the second round of the C-USA tournament to advance to the quarterfinals where they lost to Marshall. Despite having 19 wins and an above .500 record, they did not participate in a postseason tournament. UTEP averaged 7,385 fans per game, ranking 64th nationally.

Previous season
The Miners finished the season 22–11, 13–5 in C-USA play to finish in a tie for the second place. They advanced to the semifinals of the C-USA tournament where they lost to Middle Tennessee. They were invited to the National Invitation Tournament where they lost in the first round to Murray State.

Departures

Incoming Transfers

Class of 2015 recruits

Roster

Schedule

|-
!colspan=9 style="background:#; color:#;"| Exhibition

|-
!colspan=9 style="background:#; color:#;"| Non-Conference Regular season

|-
!colspan=12 style="background:#;| Conference USA regular season

|-
!colspan=9 style="background:#; "| Conference USA tournament

See also
2015–16 UTEP Lady Miners basketball team

References

UTEP Miners men's basketball seasons
UTEP